Best-Lock Construction Toys is a brand of plastic building bricks that are compatible with Lego. Best-Lock Group Limited, which manufacture the bricks, is based in Colne, Lancashire, England.

History
Best-Lock was founded in 1997 by Torsten Geller after he looked into the legalities of Lego and other Kiddicraft clones, which led him to look into Lego's past to find that Lego had copied their bricks from a British psychologist and inventor Hilary Page in the 1940s.

Best-Lock has been involved with multiple legal cases involving Lego. The company moved in 1998 against Lego's exclusivity claims to toy-block design. Best-Lock won the case in court thus allowing them to sell sets in Germany. They defeated a patent challenge from Lego in 2004. In a further case in 2009, Lego was denied trademark protection for the shape of its bricks.

Best-Lock and Cobi, a Polish building block manufacturer with a strong presence in Eastern Europe and Asia, announced a merger on 2 February 2006, in which Best-Lock purchased a part of Cobi. Plans called for Best-Lock to shift manufacturing to Cobi while Cobi expanded its manufacturing facilities. The merger has since yielded co-branded building block toys. Toys are still sold under the separate labels Best-Lock and Cobi, but many Cobi sets appear in North American retailers such as Toys R' Us and Amazon.com under the Best-Lock brand.

In 2000, Lego filed a three-dimensional trademark for its mini-figures, which Best Lock had duplicated since 1998. Thus in 2012, Best-Lock sued to get the trademark revoked. On 16 June 2015, European Court of Justice upheld Lego's figure trademark.

Products
Best-Lock offers different sized blocks including standard blocks, Junior Blocks (young children 2–5), and Baby Blocks (For kids 0–2). Themes for standard blocks include town sets (police, fire and construction), military, pirates, farming, and Kimmy (Best-Lock sets made for females). Licensed sets include The Terminator and Stargate SG-1 themes.

See also
Lego clone

References

External links

Companies based in Lancashire
Construction toys